Senegalese Popular Movement (in French: Mouvement Populaire Sénégalais) was a political party in Senegal. MPS was formed as the Senegalese section of the African Democratic Rally (RDA), following the expulsion of the Senegalese Democratic Union (UDS). MPS was led by Doudou Gueye.

A significant part of MPS led by Abdoulaye Thiaw split and joined the Senegalese Popular Bloc (BPS) in 1956. The rest of MPS finally merged with the Senegalese Progressive Union (UPS, follow-up of BPS) in 1959.

Political parties in Senegal
Sections of the Rassemblement Démocratique Africain